The Tryphoninae comprise a worldwide  subfamily of the parasitic wasp family Ichneumonidae. 
 
Most species of the Tryphoninae are koinobiont ectoparasitoids of Symphyta larvae, but members of some genera (e.g. Netelia) are ectoparasitoids of Lepidoptera larvae. Tryphonines have a hair-margined clypeus and  two longitudinal parallel ridges occur on the first tergite. The female sometimes has stalked eggs projecting from her ovipositor.

Most species are Holarctic. Fifty-one genera are described.

Tribes and genera
, the following seven tribes are recognized.

 Tribe Ankylophonini Gauld, 1984
 Ankylophon Gauld, 1984
 Tribe Eclytini Townes & Townes, 1945
 Eclytus Holmgren, 1857
 Tribe Idiogrammatini Cushman, 1942
 Idiogramma Förster, 1869
 Urotryphon Townes 1973
 Tribe Oedemopsini Woldstedt, 1877
 Acaenitellus Morley
 Atopotrophos Cushman
 Cladeutes Townes, 1969
 Debophanes Gauld
 Hercus Townes, 1969
 Leptixys Townes, 1969
 Neliopisthus Thomson, 1883
 Oedemopsis Tschek, 1869
 Scudderopsis Bennett
 Thymariodes Kasparyan
 Thymaris Forster, 1869
 Zagryphus Cushman
 Tribe Phytodietini Hellén, 1915
 Biamosa Khalaim
 Netelia Gray, 1860
 Phytodietus Gravenhorst, 1829
 Tribe Sphinctini Förster, 1869
 Sphinctus Gravenhorst, 1829
 Tribe Tryphonini Shuckard, 1840
 Acrotomus Holmgren, 1857 
 Aridella Kasparyan, 1970
 Boethella Bennett, 2003
 Boethus Forster, 1869
 Chiloplatys Townes & Townes, 1945
 Cosmoconus Forster, 1869 
 Cteniscus Haliday, 1832
 Ctenochira Forster, 1855 
 Dyspetes Forster, 1869
 Eremodolius Kasparyan, 1985
 Eridolius Förster, 1869
 Erromenus Holmgren, 1857 
 Excavarus Davis, 1897
 Grypocentrus Ruthe, 1855
 Ibornia Seyrig, 1936
 Kerrichia Mason, 1962
 Kristotomus Mason, 1962
 Lagoleptus Townes, 1969
 Ledora Kasparya, 1983
 Leviculus Townes, 1969
 Megatryphon Cockerell, 1924
 Monoblastus Hartig, 1837 
 Neleges Forster, 1869
 Orthomiscus Mason, 1955
 Otoblastus Förster, 1869
 Parablastus Constantineanu, 1973
 Polyblastus Hartig, 1837
 Scapnetes Townes, 1969
 Schelocentrus Kasparyan, 1976
 Smicroplectrus Thomson, 1883
 Thibetoides Davis, 1879
 Tryphon Fallén, 1813
 Zambion Kasparyan, 1993

References

Further reading 
Townes, H.K. (1969) Genera of Ichneumonidae, Part 1 (Ephialtinae, Tryphoninae, Labiinae, Adelognathinae, Xoridinae, Agriotypinae). Memoirs of the American Entomological Institute 11: 1–300.

External links

Diagnostic characters
Waspweb

Ichneumonidae
Taxa named by William Edward Shuckard